Field Songs is the fifth solo album by Mark Lanegan, released in 2001 on the Beggars Banquet label.

Recording
The two largest instrumental contributors are Mike Johnson and Ben Shepherd, the latter co-writing "Blues for D" with the singer.  The album also features Duff McKagan of Velvet Revolver and Guns N' Roses as well as Lanegan's ex-wife, Wendy Rae Fowler.  Chris Goss sings on "She Done too Much."

The album represents a departure of sorts for the singer.  While retaining the acoustic atmosphere of his previous solo efforts, Field Songs incorporates Middle Eastern influences ("No Easy Action") as well as experimental musical landscapes ("Miracle," "Blues for D") which elicited comparisons from critics to Tom Waits.  Lanegan's gravelly, gin-soaked vocals on "Don't Forget Me" and "Fix" is balanced out by his delicate delivery featured on "Kimiko's Dream House" and "Pill Hill Serenade."  In his 2017 book I Am the Wolf: Lyrics and Writings, Lanegan says of Field Songs:

Reception
AllMusic's Sam Samuelson writes, "Upon repeated listens, standout tracks such as 'Miracle,' 'Kimiko's Dream House,' and 'Fix' become infectiously memorable as convincing tales about love gained and lost. All in all, every track is solid and worthy of numerous spins."

Track listing

Personnel
Mark Lanegan - guitar, vocals
John Agnello - recorder, vocals, mastering, mixing (3, 5, 7, 12)
Mark Boquist - drums (2 - 5, 8)
Allen Davis - acoustic guitar (12), bass (10, 12)
Martin Feveyear - Hammond organ (4, 9, 10), recorder, vocals (6), mastering, mixing (1, 2, 4, 6, 8 - 11)
Chris Goss - synthesizer (11), vocals (11)
Mark Hoyt - vocals (9)
Mike Johnson - acoustic guitar (1 - 3, 5 - 9, 11), electric guitar (1 - 7, 12), Wurlitzer organ (2), piano (7), backing vocals 
Marek - piano (1)
Duff McKagan - drums (12), Fender Rhodes (12)
Wendy Rae Fowler - vocals (2)
Brett Netson - acoustic guitar (12)
Keni Richards - piano (5), drums (4, 6), mellotron (2)
Bill Rieflin - drums (1)
Ben Shepherd - acoustic guitar (1, 9, 10), electric guitar (1, 2, 4, 6 - 8, 10), bass (tracks: 1 - 6, 8, 9, 11), lap steel guitar (2), vocals (6), piano (10)
Chris Strother - photography

References

2001 albums
Mark Lanegan albums
Beggars Banquet Records albums
Albums produced by Martin Feveyear
Albums recorded at Robert Lang Studios
Albums recorded at Sound City Studios